Yves Cochet (born 15 February 1946) is a French politician, member of Europe Écologie–The Greens. He was minister in the government of Lionel Jospin. On 6 December 2011, he was elected member of the European Parliament (MEP).

He studied Mathematics and became researcher-lecturer at Institut National des Sciences Appliquées of Rennes in 1969. In June 1971, teaming with Maurice Nivat, he obtained a PhD for his research on « Sur l'algébricité des classes de certaines congruences définies sur le monoïde libre ».

References

Publications 
 Yves Cochet et Maurice Nivat, « Une généralisation des ensembles de Dyck », Israel Journal of Mathematics, vol. 9, nº3, septembre 1971,  .
 Sauver la Terre (avec Agnès Sinaï), éd. Fayard, Paris, 2003 .
 Pétrole apocalypse, éd. Fayard, Paris, 2005 .
 Antimanuel d'écologie, éd. Bréal, Rosny-sous-Bois, 2009 .

External links 

 Homepage (archived)

1946 births
Living people
Europe Ecology – The Greens politicians
Europe Ecology – The Greens MEPs
MEPs for France 1989–1994
MEPs for France 2009–2014
Government ministers of France
French Ministers of the Environment
Deputies of the 12th National Assembly of the French Fifth Republic
Deputies of the 13th National Assembly of the French Fifth Republic
Degrowth advocates
Politicians from Rennes
University of Rennes alumni